The Illuminati are a fictional secret society group of superheroes appearing in American comic books published by Marvel Comics. The characters joined forces and secretly work behind the scenes. The Illuminati was established to exist (via story retcon) in their first published appearance in New Avengers #7 (July 2005), written by Brian Michael Bendis. Their history was discussed in the special New Avengers: Illuminati (May 2006). The group was revealed to have been formed very shortly after the Kree–Skrull War.

The Illuminati appeared in the Marvel Cinematic Universe film Doctor Strange in the Multiverse of Madness as a team of heroes from an alternate universe known as Earth-838.

Members
Creator Bendis says of the group's members:

The group forms at some time in the aftermath of the Kree-Skrull War, and probably after the Avengers/Defenders war. Iron Man realizes that each of the individual members had information about these alien races beforehand, and they could have collectively stopped it. He brings together the Illuminati with the Black Panther in Wakanda, and proposes that they form a government of superhumans. Namor refuses, on the grounds that too many superheroes are violent outsiders (such as Hawkeye and Quicksilver, both former criminals). Xavier refuses on the grounds that mutants are already feared and hated, and if Iron Man thinks he can fight this with iconic superheroes, it will result in heroes being feared and hated as much as mutants. Doctor Strange refuses on the grounds that too many heroes are anti-establishment and that the group Iron Man has assembled to form a governing body would not be 'anti-establishment', but rather a form of 'counter-establishment'. Reed Richards refuses on the grounds that such an organization would be too large to run effectively, that the heroes would spend more time dealing with bureaucracy than actually helping people. The group does, however, agree to meet to exchange information regularly. The only individual present who outright refuses to meet or even participate with the others is the Black Panther, who fears the association will end in less than altruistic actions.

Publication history
The Illuminati first appeared in the Sentry story arc of New Avengers, written by Brian Michael Bendis. Bendis explored their history in the New Avengers: Illuminati one-shot (May 2006), which built up to the Civil War event that summer.
Bendis, along with co-writer Brian Reed and artist Jim Cheung, produced a five-issue miniseries filling out what the group does behind the scenes between their formation and dissolution. The first issue of The New Avengers: Illuminati was released in December 2006 and the final issue was released in November 2007.

New Avengers (2013–2015)
As part of Marvel NOW!, New Avengers was relaunched featuring the Illuminati.

Illuminati (2015–2016)
Following Secret Wars, a new Illuminati series was launched by writer Josh Williamson. The book features the Hood leading a new, villainous incarnation of the group. The new Illuminati includes Titania, Enchantress, Mad Thinker, Thunderball, and Black Ant.

Fictional group history

First meeting
Iron Man (representing the Avengers), Mister Fantastic (representing the Fantastic Four), Namor (representing Atlantis), Black Bolt (representing the Inhumans), Professor Xavier (representing the X-Men), Black Panther (representing Wakanda) and Doctor Strange (Sorcerer Supreme of Earth) meet in Wakanda, in the aftermath of the Kree-Skrull War that ravaged Earth. Iron Man highlights the fact that numerous heroes possessed information that could have prevented the war had they been combined, as well as the fact that Earth's heroes are the only defence against an attack on that scale. From this, he concludes that a representative body, similar to the United Nations, be established amongst the heroes. The others in attendance debate the effectiveness of such a body, pointing out issues of trust amongst heroes and the bureaucracy that would result; however, most agree that continued secret meetings such as this one could help deal with larger threats in the future. All agree to this except the Black Panther, who takes issue with their self-righteous attitudes and predicts disaster when they disagree.

Skrull Empire
The Illuminati travel to the homeworld of the Skrulls, who are still reeling from their defeat during the Kree-Skrull War on Earth. The group warns the Empire not to attack Earth again, but is unable to escape afterwards. The Skrulls analyze their captives (physiology, genetics, technology, etc.) and glean information from their behavior, until Iron Man is able to lead an escape. The Illuminati recognize that another attack is inevitable, while the Skrull Empire begins to make use of the data they compiled. By using a clone of Black Bolt and technology from Richards, the Skrulls were able to be undetected by superheroes.

Battle with the Pride
When Tony Stark relocated to Los Angeles after Obadiah Stane took over his company, the other Illuminati members leave him alone after Namor pointed out that Stark would never accept charity and needed this time to prove himself worthy of his membership. While establishing a new company, Tony encountered the Pride – the six families who controlled crime in the city, parents of the future makeshift superhero 'team' the Runaways – and learned about the Gibborim that they worshipped, prompting him to contact Doctor Strange for information about the Gibborim. This led to a brief fight between the Illuminati and the six Pride families, but although the Illuminati won and the Pride were temporarily locked up, Tony knew that the Pride were too well-connected to keep them contained for long. With that in mind, Tony left Los Angeles after leaving the Pride a warning message to inform them that he would be back if he had any reason to suspect that they were acting against his new company.

Beyonder

During the opening moments of the first "Secret Wars," Professor X and Mister Fantastic unsuccessfully attempted rendering the abducted heroes and villains forced to participate in Secret Wars unconscious using Professor X's powers of telepathy. The rationale behind their failed plan was that doing so would deny the Beyonder the pleasure of watching the two sides fight solely for his entertainment. The issue also contends that the Illuminati confronted the Beyonder during the events of Secret Wars II, a storyline with major continuity errors (Tony Stark referenced as participating in the first Secret Wars  when it was shown in issue 9 to actually be James Rhodes in Stark's Iron Man armor. The Beyonder is proclaimed to be an Inhuman who was a mutant before he was exposed to the Terrigen Mists, as well as the implication that the events of Secret Wars II never really happened and took place within an asteroid replica of Earth the Beyonder created, and that Black Bolt, under the guise as the Beyonder's "king", convinced him to go into another dimensional exile).

Marvel Boy

The Illuminati approach Noh-Varr, a Kree warrior who tried to take over the Earth, in his prison, reasoning that it is better to convince him to change on his own rather than to just try to make him change using their abilities. They demonstrate the Kree connection to the Inhumans, and their desire to protect Earth. They demonstrate the primitive nature of humanity, but also the potential of the race to evolve and better itself. Ultimately, using Captain Marvel (a deceased, Kree-born superhero), they try to convince Noh-Varr to use his powers to protect the Earth and guide humans to better themselves.

Sentry
Iron Man informs the Illuminati of the formation of a new Avengers team in light of the breakout from the Raft. All but Namor wish him well in his endeavor, and Iron Man moves on to the issue of the Sentry. Although none of the Illuminati have any recollection of him, Mr. Fantastic discovers that he has files on the Sentry and Professor Xavier discovers that his mind has been tampered with. Mr. Fantastic is able to use the files to get through to Robert Reynolds, a.k.a. the Sentry, and help him reverse what has been done to him. Iron Man tells the group that the Avengers take full responsibility for the Sentry, should he ever lose control, but dodges their questions about other recent Avengers inquiries.

Hulk
Maria Hill, Director of S.H.I.E.L.D., approaches Iron Man concerning the Hulk, who has recently destroyed Las Vegas. Iron Man presents a solution to the problem of the Hulk to the Illuminati (excluding an absent Professor X), suggesting that they shoot him into space toward an uninhabited world. Alone, Namor dissents to the plan from the outset. He argues that they have no right to banish their ally from Earth and accuses them of not helping to cure Bruce Banner to the best of their abilities. The other four members vote in favor of the plan, and Namor departs after a brief skirmish with Iron Man beneath the waves (Namor manages to tear off Iron Man's face mask before both are returned to the surface by Doctor Strange). While leaving, he says that the Black Panther was correct, and Namor predicts (correctly) that the Hulk will eventually return to seek justified revenge.

Registration and the road to Civil War
Despite deciding not to meet again, Iron Man calls together the Illuminati (excluding Professor X, who is in exile in Scotland after the "M Day" event) to introduce them to the Superhuman Registration Act. He illustrates the fact that recent events have raised suspicion of all super-powered individuals and groups, and that one wrong move on the part of a hero will trigger disaster.

A hero, probably a young one... One of the Young Avengers, or those kids in Los Angeles... Some carefree happy go-lucky, well-meaning young person with the best of intentions will do something wrong. He will be trying to save someone do something heroic but he will make a mistake. Turn to the left instead of the right and people will be hurt or killed because of it. And it will happen on live TV, or it will be recorded... and like Rodney King, it will play over and over. All over the world. Until the unrest that is already bubbling over will boil over... and every politician looking to make a name for himself will run right on TV and they will tell America how they are going to save the world from these out-of-control costumed characters who think the law does not apply to them. And half of us will go along with it and half of us will not. And because of this mini-rebellion, our lawmakers will be forced to make an example of someone. Someone like our friend Spider-Man. Someone they can make a real spectacle of. Someone they can unmask on TV, destroy his marriage and family and pin a crime or two on! All for the whole world to see. And the country will rupture. Sides will be taken and people will be hurt. Friend against friend. People who used to be adversaries finding themselves teamed up against a common cause. Friends dying at the hands of a former ally or teammate. That is what will happen.

If the Act passes, a war amongst heroes will result and cause untold damage. In order to avoid it, Iron Man reiterates his idea of a representative body of superheroes, and urges the group to come out in favor of registration prior to a disaster. While Namor dismisses the issue as none of Atlantis' business and Doctor Strange and Black Bolt disagree on principle, Mr. Fantastic agrees with Tony. The damage is done, however, and the Illuminati dissolve.

Infinity Gauntlet

Mister Fantastic reveals to the group that he has been collecting the Infinity Gems, and hopes to collect them all with the help of the Illuminati. Despite a general apprehension, the group manages to acquire all six gems. When the Gems are assembled, Mister Fantastic attempts to will the Gems out of existence, but he is unable to do so. Faced with this failure and a reprimand from Uatu the Watcher, he makes the controversial decision to give each Illuminati member one gem to hide so that they may never be combined and used again.

Civil War

Although the Illuminati never met or operated as a group during Civil War, their actions in the conflict reflect their reactions at the last meeting. Iron Man and Mr. Fantastic became two of the leading members of the pro-registration side, and worked closely with the United States government and S.H.I.E.L.D. Doctor Strange stayed out of the conflict, meditating and fasting, though he later admits, after joining the New Avengers and finding new love, that he regrets his lack of involvement. Afterward, he would join the New Avengers, who continue to operate underground without registering. Black Bolt and the Inhumans stayed out of the conflict, but began their own Cold War with the United States. Namor was involved only so far as it served his interests. This included avenging the death of his cousin in the Stamford tragedy, and coming to the aid of his friend Captain America's forces in the final battle. Professor X was not on Earth during the conflict.

World War Hulk

During Civil War, Reed is contacted by Amadeus Cho, who informs him that Hulk did not land on the intended planet. When the Hulk ultimately returns to Earth, he seeks revenge on the Illuminati as Namor had warned. He became King of the planet he landed on, before the ship self-destructs and destroyed millions of the inhabitants, along with the Hulk's wife and unborn child. His first act is to attack and defeat Black Bolt at the Inhuman settlement on the moon. Hulk arrives on Earth and sends a transmission to hand over Doctor Strange, Iron Man, and Mister Fantastic to him while giving the citizens of New York City time to evacuate. After providing New York with a twenty-four-hour time limit to hand the other three Illuminati over to him, the Hulk approaches Professor X at his mansion to determine whether he would have supported the Illuminati plan had he been present. After scanning Hulk's mind, Professor X confirms that he would have agreed with the plan, but only until a method could be found to prevent the Hulk endangering others. He battles the X-Men. After learning of the mutant population's recent severe losses as a result of "M-Day", the Hulk decides that the X-Men have suffered enough and departs. Having then taken over Manhattan Island, the Hulk is attacked by Iron Man in a new 'Hulkbuster' armor, only for him to be defeated and Stark Tower to be destroyed. Despite the aid of the other members of the Fantastic Four, including temporary members the Black Panther and Storm, the same fate befalls Mr. Fantastic. Dr. Strange tries to enter the Hulk's mind, but Hulk tricks Strange into presenting himself in a physical form that he attacks upon appearance. Strange later invokes and is possessed by the demon spirit of Zom, hoping that he could stop the Hulk before it was too late. However, he loses control of his newfound power, and he almost caused some civilians to die during his battle with the Hulk. Although the Hulk saves them, this action makes Strange lose his confidence in his powers and makes him vulnerable for the Hulk to defeat him.

Hulk then implants the Illuminati members with obedience discs and forces them to fight each other in his makeshift gladiatorial ring in Madison Square Garden. However the Hulk spared them from killing each other, showing them that he proved his point to the world. They survived the encounter by Hulk's mercy and the timely intervention of the Sentry which leads to a prolonged battle where both Hulk and the Sentry reverse back to their human forms and Bruce Banner knocks out Robert Reynolds with a final punch. This allows enough time for Stark to use prototype defense satellites to negate the Hulk's powers. The Illuminati is also partially cleared from the responsibility of Sakaar's destruction when Miek admits he saw the Red King's forces breach the ship's warp core and kept quiet to initiate what Miek felt was Hulk's destiny as the "Worldbreaker".

Namor, the only Illuminati member opposed to shooting Hulk into space from the beginning, was spared from the Hulk's vengeance and remained uninvolved throughout the conflict.

Secret Invasion

Iron Man calls the Illuminati together one more time to show them the body of the Skrull that was posing as Elektra. He feels that the Skrull represents a secret invasion of Earth, and that the group is responsible (after traveling to the Skrull Homeworld years before). His suspicions are proven to be correct when Black Bolt reveals himself to be a disguised Skrull. The five remaining members are able to barely defeat it, and its two compatriots, and begin making plans to detect and defeat the remaining Skrulls. They soon realize, however, that this is pointless, as they cannot trust each other, going each his own way, for better or for worse, upon realizing that they have lost far more than just a world: they have lost each other's trust, and have lost the last hope of uniting the superheroes against the Skrulls.

Though in Secret Invasion, just like in Civil War, though for reasonably different incentives (they could not trust each other because of their own actions during the War, and they could not trust each other because of the actions of outside enemies during the Invasion), the Illuminati never worked together as a group, and the Illuminati itself is most likely to be permanently shattered. However, all six of them were affected in some way during the invasion, as were all inhabitants and allies of Earth.

Iron Man and Mister Fantastic were the two chief fighters of the Secret Invasion, taking central roles in the main battles, and key to the ultimate failure of the Invasion, though neither survived unscathed. Iron Man brought the Skrull corpse to the world's top minds, and summoned Criti Noll (in the form of Henry Pym) and Mister Fantastic to examine and dissect the body. Stark was soon, as planned by the Skrulls, called in, along with his Mighty Avengers to the Savage Land, where one of the first and most significant of battles of the invasion took place. It started when a spaceship crashed there, several dozen superheroes came out, and the New Avengers also arrived on the scene. Just as Mister Fantastic ingeniously discovers the method of concealment the Skrulls have been utilizing to become virtually undetectable, Criti Noll acts, using a special, Skrull-designed gun to subdue Reed Richards and prevent him from maintaining solidity; the remaining members of the Fantastic Four are also swiftly taken out elsewhere for most of the invasion, though all survive, if but barely. Agent Abigail Brand of S.W.O.R.D. frees Mister Fantastic and takes control over the Skrull ship he was held in to the Savage Land, but sadly not before the Skrulls manages to infect Iron Man with an alien virus disabling himself, his armor, and S.H.I.E.L.D. itself. Veranke, disguised as Spider-Woman, also attempts to crush and destabilize what remains of Stark's morale, will, and faith by trying to convince him he is actually a Skrull sleeper agent, but the Black Widow convinces him, at least slightly, otherwise. Richards and Brand arrive, with Reed using a self-designed machine to reveal the Skrulls in the midst of the Savage Land battle, which are quickly disposed of by the heroes. Reed and Tony lead the other heroes back to the now chaotic New York for the final battle, in which Reed exposes the Skrulls and which he is a prime target. Reed survives, and Tony, though his secondhand and relatively crude armor he had quickly constructed suffer enough damage to force him to initially retreat from the battle scene, uses a spare old Iron Man armor to enable him to aid the struggle against the Skrulls, freeing the prisoners, including Pym and Jarvis.

Quest of the Hood
The Illuminati reunited with founding members Iron Man, Mister Fantastic, Doctor Strange and Professor Xavier returning. Medusa has joined the group as well (filling in for the presumably deceased Black Bolt) after learning that the Hood is targeting them for the Infinity Gems, seeking to reform the Infinity Gauntlet and regain the power he lost after the Siege of Asgard. With the Hood having been defeated once more, the Infinity Gems were re-divided among the Illuminati members with Captain America in possession of the sixth gem in Black Bolt's absence.

Aborted reunion
Captain America arranged another meeting of the Illuminati during the war between the Avengers and the X-Men in an attempt to talk with Namor after he was possessed by the Phoenix Force, but the meeting quickly fell apart; Professor X resented how the other four members were subconsciously blaming him for the current mess, Mister Fantastic felt that the Phoenix Five were not actually doing anything wrong as their actions had all been fundamentally beneficial, and Doctor Strange and Tony Stark felt that the meeting was pointless as they doubted that Namor would appear. When Namor arrived in the room after the others had left, Captain America asked him to stand down, but Namor refused, although he acknowledged that he still respected Captain America as a friend and ally.

Colliding universes
When Black Panther discovered a threat to the entire Marvel Universe, he saw no option but to call together the Illuminati again, including former member Black Bolt and, later, mutant scientist Beast, to deal with the threat. Professor X is not part of the call because he was killed at the end of the war between the Avengers and the X-Men. This new convocation of the Illuminati is now composed of the team of New Avengers.

Before the meeting with the Illuminati, Black Panther privately confronts Namor (who had previously killed hundreds of Wakandans) in a locked and guarded room. Their conversation is brief but tense, with Namor, still king of Atlantis, unbowed before Black Panther's tightly controlled rage. Black Panther informs Namor that as soon as the current crisis is settled, Black Panther will kill him.

When Captain America attempts to use the Infinity Gauntlet to push the colliding planet back for some time, he makes a valiant effort, but the gems are destroyed, with the exception of the time gem, which vanishes to parts unknown. Afterwards, Captain America argues that the Illuminati are wrong to consider building a world-destroying weapon to help save Earth, and that doing so will corrupt them. Iron Man has already anticipated that Captain America will respond in that way, and therefore Doctor Strange has prepared a spell that he uses to wipe Captain America's mind of the Illuminati meeting.

During the "Original Sin" storyline, following the murder of Uatu the Watcher, Captain America's exposure to Uatu's eye during the confrontation with the Orb restores his memory. After Captain America and the Avengers are transported into the future realities with the time gem, Captain America announces that the Illuminati are to be arrested.

Time Runs Out and Secret Wars
Later, the Illuminati face off against the Great Society(Sun god/Zoran,Boundless,Doctor Spectrum,The Rider,The Jovian and Norn) a team of heroes from the latest parallel Earth that involved in an Incursion. Black Panther initially intends to destroy the Great Society's world by using an antimatter bomb, but relents at the last minute after realizing he cannot commit mass murder. However, Namor steals the trigger from Black Panther, and destroys the planet himself, resulting in his expulsion from the group. It is later revealed that Namor has partnered with a group of villains to form a new Cabal in order to destroy parallel worlds that may become involved in Incursions.

Eight months later, the Avengers are shown to be working with S.H.I.E.L.D. to track down and capture the Illuminati. Amadeus Cho, Captain Britain and Hank Pym have joined the team in the aftermath of Namor's expulsion, and work against the Avengers to protect the Earth by any means necessary.

Despite Namor's Cabal achieving legitimacy as Earth's protectors, Namor grew weary of the wholesale slaughter they carried out in the name of preserving their universe. Although he collaborated with the Illuminati in a plan to destroy the Cabal by trapping them on the next Earth to be destroyed, Black Panther and Black Bolt left him behind to die with the Cabal, disgusted at his earlier actions. However, that world had a second simultaneous Incursion happen, allowing Namor and the Cabal to escape to the third Earth, in the Ultimate universe.

The Avengers and the Illuminati learned Hank Pym had discovered that the Beyonders are responsible for the Universe Incursions that have been plaguing the Multiverse and that they annihilated the Cosmic entities in the entire Multiverse.

When the final incursion occurs during the Secret Wars storyline, resulting in all realities collapsing into one Earth, Mister Fantastic and the Black Panther survive the incursion in a specially-designed 'life pod' along with a few other heroes, while Strange comes through the incursion while assuming a role as Doctor Doom's 'sheriff', aiding Doom in ruling the new 'Battleworld' created from the multiple realities. Meanwhile, Namor survived with the Cabal and the Ultimate Reed Richards when they escaped the Ultimate Marvel universe during the final incursion. Once the two groups were awoken on Battleworld, faced with the threat of Doom, Namor and Black Panther put aside their past issues to work together and gather weapons to oppose the god-level Doom after Strange sacrificed his life to send the heroes to safety. While Reed researched the source of Doom's power, Namor and T'Challa followed clues left by Strange to reassemble the Infinity Gauntlet (Strange having manipulated events so that Doom's castle was built in the one area where a complete set of Infinity Gems still existed), which T'Challa wielded against Doom in the final battle while Richards found a way to disrupt Doom's power and take it for himself to rebuild the multiverse.

Cabal

The Cabal was a more villainous and antiheroic counterpart of the Illuminati consisting of the supervillains and anti-heroes Norman Osborn, Doctor Doom, Hood, Loki, Emma Frost and Namor.

Namor later forms a second incarnation of the Cabal to combat incursions which consists of himself, Thanos, Maximus the Mad, Terrax, Black Swan, and Black Order members Corvus Glaive and Proxima Midnight.

Hood's Illuminati
As part of the All-New, All-Different Marvel event, Hood creates his version of the Illuminati to acquire power and become part of the "big leagues" of the supervillains. Besides Hood, the members consist of a rebuilt Black Ant (a Life Model Decoy of Eric O'Grady that was created by Father), Sylvie Lushton (the current Enchantress), Mad Thinker, Thunderball and Titania.

During the Avengers: Standoff! storyline, Hood and Titania raid Pleasant Hill to retrieve Absorbing Man when Baron Helmut Zemo and Fixer restore the memories of the inmates there. Absorbing Man sides with the Illuminati as they plan their revenge on S.H.I.E.L.D. with other recruited prisoners such as Whirlwind.

Roster
Members as of New Avengers Vol. 3 #3

Original team

Recruits

Other versions

Earth-231
In this reality, Mister Fantastic killed the other Illuminati members to keep them from being too ambitious.

Earth-976
In this reality, the Illuminati consisted of Iron Man, Mister Fantastic, Namor, Black Bolt, Doctor Doom and Magneto. The Superhuman Registration Act and the Initiative were successfully implemented because Doctor Doom and Magneto were members of the Illuminati.

Earth-2319
This Illuminati included Mister Fantastic, Doctor Doom, the Black Panther, Yellowjacket, Captain Britain (Betsy Braddock), Captain Britain (Brian Braddock), Iron Man and Emma Frost. They and their world were destroyed by Mapmakers during an incursion event.

Earth-23099
This Illuminati included Mister Fantastic, Iron Man, Professor X, Shuri, Black Panther, Black Bolt, Magneto and Mar-Vell. They and their world were destroyed by Black Priests during an incursion.

Marvel Apes
In the Marvel Apes universe, the Illuminati are referred to as the Prime Eight. They consist of Black Bolt, Cleook, Doctor Doom, Nicole Furry, Hulk, Iron Mandrill, Professor X and Silverback Surfer.

What If
A What If detailed alternate outcomes of the Age of Ultron storyline. In this reality, the Illuminati plan to restore a national symbol of hope after the death of Captain America. They choose Frank Castle as Captain America's successor, because his service to his country makes him that symbol. Mister Fantastic gives Castle a better version of the Super-Soldier serum, making him the new Captain America. Decades later, Iron Man's plan to mass-produce serum-powered "Captain Americas" for each state for the Captain Americorps initiative disillusions Castle, who decides to retire.

In other media
 The Illuminati make a cameo appearance in Planet Hulk, consisting of Iron Man, Doctor Strange, Mister Fantastic and Black Bolt.
 The Illuminati appear in Doctor Strange in the Multiverse of Madness (2022). This version of the group hails from Earth-838 and consists of its versions of Karl Mordo, Captain Peggy Carter, Black Bolt, Maria Rambeau / Captain Marvel, Reed Richards, and Charles Xavier. Their universe's Stephen Strange was also a member until the Illuminati executed him for drawing power from the Darkhold and replaced him with Mordo. They arrest Stephen Strange of Earth-616 and America Chavez for threatening the multiverse, but all save for Mordo are killed by the Scarlet Witch.

References

External links
 Illuminati at Marvel.com
 Illuminati at Marvel Wiki
 Illuminati (Hood's version) at Marvel Wiki

Comics characters introduced in 1971
Comics characters introduced in 2005
Marvel Comics American superheroes
Fictional organizations in Marvel Comics
Comics by Brian Michael Bendis
Works about the Illuminati